Jessica Moore may refer to:
Jessica Moore (actress) (born 1967), Italian actress in the 1987 film Eleven Days, Eleven Nights
Jessica Moore (basketball) (born 1982), WNBA player for the Indiana Fever
Jessica Moore (journalist) (born 1982), American journalist
Jessica Moore (tennis) (born 1990), Australian tennis player
Jessica Care Moore (born 1971), American poet